

301001–301100 

|-id=021
| 301021 Sofiarodriguez ||  || Sofia Rodriguez (born 2014), great-granddaughter of the American discoverer James Whitney Young || 
|-id=061
| 301061 Egelsbach ||  || Egelsbach, a German city located between Frankfurt am Main and Darmstadt. || 
|}

301101–301200 

|-id=153
| 301153 Jinan ||  || The Chinese city of Jinan, also known as "Tsinan" or "Spring City", is the capital of the Shandong province in Eastern China, and the location of the Shandong University's main campus. || 
|}

301201–301300 

|-id=263
| 301263 Anitaheward ||  || Anita Heward (born 1974) is a freelance science communicator working for Europlanet, the Royal Astronomical Society and Twinkle space mission. She was the founder of the British Festival of Space, assisted in establishing the UK National Space Centre in Leicester, UK, and encourages gender equality in science. || 
|}

301301–301400 

|-id=394
| 301394 Bensheim ||  || Bensheim, a town in Hesse, Germany, first mentioned in 765 AD. || 
|}

301401–301500 

|-bgcolor=#f2f2f2
| colspan=4 align=center | 
|}

301501–301600 

|-id=511
| 301511 Hubinon ||  || Victor Hubinon (1924–1979) was a Belgian comic book artist. With Jean-Michel Charlier, he created the series Buck Danny. || 
|-id=522
| 301522 Chaykin ||  || Konstantin Yurievich Chaykin (born 1975) is a Russian watchmaker and inventor. He is a creator of the most complicated watches in the world and has won many international awards. || 
|-id=553
| 301553 Ninaglebova ||  || Nina Il'inichna Glebova (born 1937) is a senior scientific worker at the IAA RAS, and was the Editor-in-Chief of the Astronomical Yearbook for many years. || 
|-id=566
| 301566 Melissajane ||  || Melissa Jane Forward (born 1980), youngest daughter of British discoverer Norman Falla || 
|}

301601–301700 

|-id=638
| 301638 Kressin ||  || Margarete Kressin (1891–1980), grandmother of German discoverer Rainer Kracht || 
|}

301701–301800 

|-id=794
| 301794 Antoninkapustin ||  || Andrey Ivanovich Kapustin (archimandrite Antonin) (1817–1894) was the head of the Russian Ecclesiastic Mission in Jerusalem. || 
|}

301801–301900 

|-bgcolor=#f2f2f2
| colspan=4 align=center | 
|}

301901–302000 

|-bgcolor=#f2f2f2
| colspan=4 align=center | 
|}

References 

301001-302000